August Konrad was a member of the Wisconsin State Assembly. He was elected to the Assembly in 1890 and 1892. Additionally, Konrad was a member of the county board of Washington County, Wisconsin from 1883 to 1888 and again in 1890. He was a Democrat. Konrad was born on September 17, 1849, in Milwaukee, Wisconsin.

References

Politicians from Milwaukee
County supervisors in Wisconsin
Democratic Party members of the Wisconsin State Assembly
1849 births
Year of death missing